Matthew Hackett (born March 7, 1990) is a Canadian former ice hockey goaltender. He played 26 games in the National Hockey League with the Minnesota Wild and Buffalo Sabres between 2011 and 2015. The rest of his career, which lasted from 2010 to 2020, was mainly spent in the minor American Hockey League.

He was selected by the Minnesota Wild in the 3rd round (77th overall) of the 2009 NHL Entry Draft. Matt is a nephew to former NHL goaltender Jeff Hackett.

Playing career
Hackett was called up to the NHL as a backup to Josh Harding on November 23, 2011, for a game against the Nashville Predators after Niklas Bäckström missed the game for personal reasons. In case Hackett did not arrive at the game in time (from his assignment with the Houston Aeros), 51-year-old recreational goaltender Paul Deutsch was signed to an amateur tryout contract, but was eventually scratched as Hackett served as the backup.

Hackett made his National Hockey League (NHL) debut on December 6, 2011, in a road game against the San Jose Sharks, entering 1:11 into the game after starting goalie Harding was injured. In his debut game, Hackett earned a perfect 1.000 save percentage by making 34 saves on 34 shots, a performance that helped lead the Minnesota Wild to a 2–1 victory with the only goal against Minnesota having been in the first minute of play, prior to Hackett entering the game. 
On December 8, 2011, two days after his NHL debut, Matt Hackett made his first NHL start as the Minnesota Wild played against the Los Angeles Kings. Hackett stopped 42 of 44 shots for a .955 save percentage, helping to lead the Wild to a 4–2 win. In both of these games, Hackett was named the number one star for the game.

On March 2, 2012, after the Wild lost Bäckström to a groin injury, Hackett was again recalled as a back-up to Josh Harding.

During the lockout shortened 2012–13 season, Hackett was dealt at the trade deadline on April 3, 2013, along with Johan Larsson, a 1st round pick in 2013, and a 2nd round pick in 2014 from the Minnesota Wild in exchange for Jason Pominville and a 4th round pick in 2014.

Hackett participated in the 2013 Spengler Cup.  His team, the Rochester Americans were invited to participate as one of the teams and Hackett served as their goalie.  Rochester was eliminated in the Quarterfinals losing 6–3 to Team Canada.  However, Team Canada goalie Chris Mason was injured, so Team Canada called up Hackett to replace him, as he was still in Davos and his team was no longer in the tournament.  He played for Canada in the Semifinal game, which they lost 6–5 to Genève-Servette HC.  As such, Hackett became the first player to play for two different teams in the same Spengler Cup tournament.

Hackett made his debut with the Sabres on March 20, 2014, against the Edmonton Oilers. Hackett was called up on an emergency recall after goaltenders Michal Neuvirth and Jhonas Enroth were both injured before a west-coast road trip. Hackett made 35 saves on 36 shots in a 2–1 victory. On April 9, 2014, it was announced that Hackett will act as goaltender for the remaining three games of the season, proving himself in the game on April 8 with 33 saves against the Detroit Red Wings. On April 12, 2014, Hackett suffered a major knee injury against the Boston Bruins. As of April 15, 2014 the Sabres announced Hackett would not return from injury until December, 2015.

On July 1, 2015, Hackett signed as a free agent to a two-year contract with the Anaheim Ducks. Hackett endured two largely disappointing seasons within the Ducks organization, appearing in 29 games with AHL affiliate, the San Diego Gulls. He missed the majority of the 2016-17 campaign after undergoing left shoulder surgery.

As a free agent from the Ducks, Hackett was unable to secure a NHL contract and accepted a one-year ECHL deal with the Orlando Solar Bears on September 5, 2017. However, after making one appearance with the Solar Bears to start the 2017–18 season, in late October, Hackett left the team to pursue opportunities outside of the ECHL and was suspended indefinitely by the team. He later signed abroad to play out the season with Slovakian club, HC 07 Detva of the Tipsport Liga (Slovak).

Hackett played the 2018-19 season in the Elite Ice Hockey League with the Coventry Blaze before signing a one-year contract with Norwegian club, Stjernen Hockey of GET-ligaen on June 10, 2019.

Career statistics

Awards and honours

References

External links

1990 births
Living people
Buffalo Sabres players
Canadian ice hockey goaltenders
Coventry Blaze players
HC 07 Detva players
Houston Aeros (1994–2013) players
Sportspeople from London, Ontario
Ice hockey people from Ontario
Minnesota Wild draft picks
Minnesota Wild players
Orlando Solar Bears (ECHL) players
Plymouth Whalers players
Rochester Americans players
San Diego Gulls (AHL) players
Stjernen Hockey players
Utah Grizzlies (ECHL) players
Windsor Spitfires players
Canadian expatriate ice hockey players in the United States
Canadian expatriate ice hockey players in Slovakia
Canadian expatriate ice hockey players in England
Canadian expatriate ice hockey players in Norway